Malotigena is a genus of flowering plants in the ice plant family Aizoaceae. It has only one currently accepted species, Malotigena frantiskae-niederlovae, native to Lesotho. The foliage turns red in autumn.

Its cultivar 'Gold Nugget' has gained the Royal Horticultural Society's Award of Garden Merit.

References

Aizoaceae
Aizoaceae genera
Endemic flora of Lesotho
Monotypic Caryophyllales genera